New Hampshire is the eighth wealthiest state in the United States, having a median household income of $76,768 as of 2019. The most affluent parts of the state are in the Seacoast Region, in the outer Boston suburbs and around Dartmouth College. Ranked below are the 234 incorporated cities and towns, and one inhabited township, in New Hampshire by median household income, using the 2013-2017 American Community Survey 5-year data (2017 dollars).

See also
 List of cities and towns in New Hampshire
 New Hampshire locations by per capita income

References

Economy of New Hampshire
Household income lists